East Pharsalia is a hamlet in Chenango County, New York, United States. East Pharsalia had a post office from March 10, 1830 until September 28, 2002; it still has its own ZIP code, 13758.

References

Hamlets in Chenango County, New York
Hamlets in New York (state)